The Putative Bacterial Archaeal Holin (BAH) Family (TC# 9.B.185) consists of several uncharacterized proteins. However, these proteins were retrieved when functionally characterized holins from the T-A Hol family (TC# 1.E.43) were BLASTED against the NCBI database, and thus may be related to the T-A Hol family. Most BAH proteins are between 125 and 140 amino acyl residues (aas) in length and exhibit 4 transmembrane segments (TMSs), although at least one putative holin (TC# 9.B.185.1.4) is almost 260 aas long. A representative list of proteins belonging to the BAH family can be found in the Transporter Classification Database.

See also 
 Holin
 Lysin
 Transporter Classification Database

Further reading 
 Reddy, Bhaskara L.; Saier Jr., Milton H. (2013-11-01). "Topological and phylogenetic analyses of bacterial holin families and superfamilies". Biochimica et Biophysica Acta (BBA) - Biomembranes 1828 (11): 2654–2671. . . .
 Saier, Milton H.; Reddy, Bhaskara L. (2015-01-01). "Holins in Bacteria, Eukaryotes, and Archaea: Multifunctional Xenologues with Potential Biotechnological and Biomedical Applications". Journal of Bacteriology 197(1): 7–17. . . . .
 Wang, I. N.; Smith, D. L.; Young, R. (2000-01-01). "Holins: the protein clocks of bacteriophage infections". Annual Review of Microbiology 54: 799–825. . . .
 Young, R.; Bläsi, U. (1995-08-01). "Holins: form and function in bacteriophage lysis". FEMS Microbiology Reviews 17 (1-2): 191–205. . .

References 

Protein families
Membrane proteins
Transmembrane proteins
Transmembrane transporters
Transport proteins
Integral membrane proteins
Holins